Ekkapoom Potharungroj (born March 29, 1985) is a retired professional footballer from Thailand.

Honours

Club
Thai Port
 Thai League Cup winner (1) : 2010

Muangthong United
 Thai League 1 Champions (1): 2012

BEC Tero Sasana
 Thai League Cup winner (1) : 2014

References

1985 births
Living people
Ekkapoom Potharungroj
Ekkapoom Potharungroj
Association football wingers
Ekkapoom Potharungroj
Ekkapoom Potharungroj
Ekkapoom Potharungroj
Ekkapoom Potharungroj
Ekkapoom Potharungroj
Ekkapoom Potharungroj
Ekkapoom Potharungroj
Ekkapoom Potharungroj